Jeet is a Hindi TV serial that aired on Star Plus from 10 October 2003 to 2 April 2004. It is based on lives of three individuals (Vikram, Janki and Nandini) and their love, of trust and of sacrifice. It is the story of how losing yourself in love is the best victory that you can have.

Plot
The show is mainly based on the life of a young arrogant boy, Vikram Mall, who leaves behind a successful life in abroad to go back to India to teach at a college where he graduated from, because he deems that he can make a difference. At first, his excessive uprising to the old college’s authority gets him on the wrong side of the trustees, but slowly he manages to gain back the trust of the authority members, and they get him popular among students and other teachers.
Vikram's charm first annoys and then interests Janki, a colleague, and they are drawn to each other. But all these hopes are soon washed out as Mall's scarred past catches up with him. The trustee of the college Jamini Devi whose daughter Nandini and Vikram were once in love is hell-bent on throwing Vikram out of the college unless they get back together again much against Jamini Devi's well laid plans.
Shortly as the time passes, Nandini also comes as a professor to the college with the sole intention of spiting Vikram. Nandini and Mall are in fact victims of a misunderstanding which was carefully planned out by Nandini's, mother Jamini Devi.

Cast
 Ankur Nayyar as Vikram Mal
 Aparna Tilak as Janki Mal Sehgal
 Mrinal Kulkarni as Amrita
 Neeru Bajwa as Nandini
 Kanika Kohli as Naina
 Dileep Saxena as Doctor
 Sunaina as Ritu
 Bharat Kapoor as Mr. Sharma
 Anupam Shyam as Kantaprasad
 Pavan Malhotra as Rekhari
 Arun Govil as Venu
 Aishwarya Sakhuja as Richa
 Shekhar Shukla as College Professor
 Krutika Desai Khan as Jamini Devi
 Mohan as Amrita's Father-In-Law
 Abbas Khan as Amrita's Husband
 Rakesh as Vikram's Friend
 Sumit Pathak as Rahul
 Vaquar Shaikh as College Professor
 Anupam Bhattacharya as Siddharth
 Mohan Gupte as Vikram's Father
 Savita Prabhune as Vikram's Mother
 Nigaar Khan as Anjali
 Hussain Kuwajerwala as Dev
 Alefia Kapadia as Nisha
 Ashish Kapoor as Saurav
 Sudhir Mitoo as Mr. Makhija
 Gulfam Ali as Mrs. Makhija
 Dinesh Hakku as Saurav's Father
 Manju Vyas as Saurav's Mother
 Ranvir Khurana as Sharad

References

2000 Indian television series debuts
2004 Indian television series endings
Indian drama television series
StarPlus original programming
Rose Audio Visuals
2003 Indian television series debuts